Hipec may refer to:
Hipec, a Canadian aircraft fabric covering process
Hyperthermic intraperitoneal chemotherapy, a type of hyperthermia therapy